Rubus dasyphyllus is a species of bramble found in northwest Europe, including Belgium, Denmark, Germany, the Netherlands, and the British Isles. It may be extinct in Sweden.

Description
Rubus dasyphyllus is an arching shrub with a hairy, reddish stem. Glands, both stalked and sessile are also numerous on the stem. The leaves are divided into 3–5 leaflets; these are light glossy green and hairless above, and greyish and downy below. Flowers are pink, about 2.5cm in diameter, and form a compact terminal inflorescence, with smaller axillary inflorescences.

Distribution and habitat
Rubus dasyphyllus is one of the commonest bramble species in parts of Great Britain, particularly in Wales, and northern England. It is absent from the Scottish Highlands and the southern half of Ireland. Its range extends to east to Germany.

References

dasyphyllus
Flora of Europe